Ivan Stepanovich Perov (6 October 1910 – 26 January 1989) was a michman of the Soviet Navy, bos'n-signalman of the Soviet submarine L-4 during the Second World War. He also served at some other ships. 

On 22 July 1944 he was awarded Hero of the Soviet Union for his courage and heroism. He was also awarded several other orders and medals.

The village of Perove was named after him. A memorial plaque was mounted on the house where he lived in Odessa after the war.

References

1910 births
1989 deaths
Heroes of the Soviet Union
Soviet Navy personnel
Submariners
Recipients of the Order of Lenin
People from Leningrad Oblast
Soviet military personnel of World War II